The Stockholm Town Housemaid School was a vocational school started in 1938 at Scheelegatan 8 on the island of Kungsholmen in Stockholm, Sweden. The school educated housemaids. It was established during a shortage of housemaids, and the idea was well received. The students were graded, and the classes where photographed wearing housemaid uniforms.

Harald Norbelie has depicted the school in a chapter of the 1993 book .

References 

1938 establishments in Sweden
20th century in Stockholm
Defunct schools in Sweden
Domestic work
Educational institutions established in 1938
Vocational education